I Prefer the Moonlight is the twentieth studio album by country singer Kenny Rogers. It reached #18 on the charts. Though the album only reached #163 in the Billboard 200.It contained three top five singles: the title cut and the grammy-winning duet with Ronnie Milsap, "Make No Mistake, She's Mine" and "The Factory". The album was Rogers' final studio album for RCA Nashville.

Singles
The initial single was the Ronnie Milsap duet "Make No Mistake, She's Mine", which brought Rogers and Milsap to the top of the charts in both the US and Canada. The title cut was released next, and reached #2, a feat equaled to the north as well. "The Factory" was the third single, and reached #6 in the US and #3 in Canada. A final venture was made with "I Don't Call Him Daddy", a lesser hit, peaking at #86. (The release of "I Don't Call Him Daddy" was to support the 1988 RCA "Greatest Hits" release, and received little promotion as Rogers was leaving the label.)

Track listing

Personnel 

 Kenny Rogers – lead vocals
 Shane Keister – keyboards (1), additional keyboards (2), synthesizers (4)
 Robbie Buchanan – additional keyboards (2)
 Keith Thomas – keyboards (2)
 Philip Aaberg – acoustic piano (3, 5, 7)
 John Barlow Jarvis – acoustic piano (3, 5, 7, 9, 10)
 Jim Lang – organ (3, 5, 7)
 Alan Pasqua – synthesizers (3, 5, 7)
 Clayton Ivey – acoustic piano (4)
 Ronnie Milsap – electric piano (4), lead and harmony vocals (4)
 Bobby Ogdin – keyboards (6, 8, 9, 10), acoustic piano (9, 10)
 Gary Chapman – acoustic guitar (1), backing vocals (1)
 Dann Huff – guitar (1, 2, 3, 5, 7)
 Jerry McPherson – slide guitar (1), guitar (2)
 Mark O'Connor – mandolin (1), fiddle (1)
 Dean Parks – guitar (3, 5, 7)
 Fred Tackett – guitar (3, 5, 7)
 Bruce Dees – electric guitar (4)
 Jimmy Capps – acoustic guitar (6, 8)
 Pete Wade – acoustic guitar (6, 8) 
 Billy Sanford – electric guitar (6, 8)
 Don Potter – acoustic guitar (9, 10), backing vocals (10) 
 Larry Byrom – electric guitar (9, 10)
 Mike Brignardello – bass (1, 2)
 Neil Stubenhaus – bass (3, 5, 7)
 David Hungate – bass (4, 9, 10)
 Bob Wray – bass (6, 8)
 Jack Williams – bass (9, 10)
 Paul Leim – drums (1, 2)
 John Robinson – drums (3, 5, 7)
 Larrie Londin – drums (4)
 James Stroud – drums (6, 8), percussion (6)
 Eddie Bayers – drums (9, 10)
 Lenny Castro – percussion (1, 2)
 Richard Landis – percussion (3, 5, 7)
 Charlie Calello – arrangements (3, 5, 7)
 David T. Clydesdale – string arrangements (4)
 Shelby Singleton – string arrangements (6)
 Archie Jordan – string arrangements (9, 10)
 Carl Gorodetzky – concertmaster (4, 6, 8, 9, 10)
 The Nashville String Machine – strings (4, 6, 8, 9, 10)
 Kim Carnes – backing vocals (1)
 Chris Harris – backing vocals (1)
 Wayne Kirkpatrick – backing vocals (1, 2)
 Diana DeWitt – backing vocals (2)
 Chris Eaton – backing vocals (2)
 Tommy Funderburk – backing vocals (3, 5, 7)
 Jim Haas – backing vocals (3, 5, 7)
 Jon Joyce – backing vocals (3, 5, 7)
 Clif Magness – backing vocals (3, 5, 7)
 George Merill – backing vocals (3, 5, 7)
 Wendy Suits-Johnson – backing vocals (6, 8)
 Diane Vanette – backing vocals (6, 8)
 Bergen White – backing vocals (6, 8)
 Dennis Wilson – backing vocals (6, 8)
 Juice Newton – harmony vocals (9)

Production 
 Producers – Brown Bannister (Tracks 1 & 2); Richard Landis (Tracks 3, 5 & 7); Rob Galbraith and Kyle Lehning (Track 4); Larry Butler (Tracks 6 & 8); Brent Maher (Tracks 9 & 10).
 Production Coordinator on Track 2 – Kimberley Smith
 Engineers – Jeff Balding (Tracks 1 & 2); Mick Guzauski and Rick Ruggeri (Tracks 3, 5 & 7); Ben Harris and Kyle Lehning (Track 4); Harold Lee and Billy Sherrill (Tracks 6 & 8); Richard Landis and Brent Maher (Tracks 9 & 10).
 Assistant Engineers – Jean Kinney and Dave Parker (Tracks 1 & 2); Richard McKernan (Tracks 3, 5 & 7); Randy Gardner (Track 4); Jim McKell (Tracks 9 & 10).
 Assistant Overdub Engineers – Michael Koreiba, Laura Livingston, Keith Odle and Bill Whittington (Tracks 1 & 2); Jim Dineen (Tracks 3, 5 & 7).
 Horns and Strings recorded by Rick Ruggeri, assisted by Michael Dotson and James Johnson.
 Recorded at Eleven Eleven Studio, GroundStar Laboratories, Creative Recording, Inc. and Sixteenth Avenue Sound (Nashville, TN); Hitsville (Los Angeles, CA); The Grey Room and Conway Studios (Hollywood, CA).
 Overdubbed at The Grey Room; Lion Share Recording (Los Angeles, CA); Masterfonics and MasterMix (Nashville, TN).
 Mixing – Jeff Balding (Tracks 1 & 2); Ed Thacker (Tracks 3, 5 & 7); Brent Maher (Tracks 9 & 10).
 Mix Assistant on Tracks 1 & 2 – Michael Koreiba
 Mixed at Masterfonics, Eleven Eleven Studio and GroundStar Laboratories (Nashville, TN); The Grey Room (Hollywood, CA).
 Album Editing by Glenn Meadows 
 Mastering – Glenn Meadows (Tracks 1, 2, 9 & 10); Wally Traugott (Tracks 3, 5 & 7); Doug Sax (Tracks 4); Denny Purcell (Tracks 6 & 8).
 Mastered at Georgetown Masters and Masterfonics (Nashville, TN); Capitol Studios and The Mastering Lab (Hollywood, CA).
 Art Direction – Mary Hamilton 
 Design – John Coulter
 Photography – Kelly Junkermann
 Management – Ken Kragen

Charts

References

Kenny Rogers albums
1987 albums
Albums produced by Larry Butler (producer)
Albums produced by Richard Landis
Albums produced by Brent Maher
RCA Records albums